Crownpoint Airport  is a public-use airport located three nautical miles (4 mi, 6 km) northwest of the central business district of Crownpoint, in McKinley County, New Mexico, United States.

This is one of six airports owned by the Navajo Nation; the others being Shiprock Airport (5V5) in New Mexico, plus Chinle Airport (E91), Kayenta Airport (0V7), Tuba City Airport (T03) and Window Rock Airport (RQE) in Arizona.

Facilities and aircraft 
Crownpoint Airport covers an area of 22 acres (9 ha) at an elevation of 6,696 feet (2,041 m) above mean sea level. It has one runway designated 18/36 with an asphalt surface measuring 5,820 by 60 feet (1,774 x 18 m). For the 12-month period ending April 13, 2011, the airport had 500 aircraft operations, an average of 41 per month: 60% air taxi and 40% general aviation.

References

External links 
 Crownpoint Airport at Navajo Air Transportation Department
 Aerial image as of 9 May 1998 from USGS The National Map
 

Airports in New Mexico
Navajo Nation airports
Buildings and structures in McKinley County, New Mexico
Transportation in McKinley County, New Mexico